Blaž Kavčič was the defending champion, but has chosen not to compete.
Paul Capdeville won the final 6–2, 6–2 against Renzo Olivo.

Seeds

Draw

Finals

Top half

Bottom half

References
 Main Draw
 Qualifying Draw

IS Open de Tenis - Singles
2013 Singles